Dowdell is a surname. Notable people with the surname include:

James R. Dowdell (1847–1921), American jurist and the 20th Chief Justice of the Alabama Supreme Court 
John E. Dowdell (born 1955), United States District Judge on the United States District Court for the Northern District of Oklahoma
James Ferguson Dowdell (1818–1871), second President of the East Alabama College, now known as Auburn University and a U.S. Representative from Alabama
Jeff Dowdell (born 1987), Australian professional basketball player
Rel Dowdell, American screenwriter, film director, film producer, and English/screenwriting educator
Robert Dowdell (1932–2018), American actor
Shanavia Dowdell (born 1987), American professional basketball player
Zabian Dowdell (born 1984), American professional basketball player

See also
 Dowdall